The canton of Caudry is an administrative division of the Nord department, northern France. It was created at the French canton reorganisation which came into effect in March 2015. Its seat is in Caudry.

It consists of the following communes:

Avesnes-les-Aubert
Beaurain
Beauvois-en-Cambrésis
Bermerain
Béthencourt
Bévillers
Boussières-en-Cambrésis
Cagnoncles
Capelle
Carnières
Caudry
Cauroir
Escarmain
Estourmel
Haussy
Iwuy
Montrécourt
Naves
Quiévy
Rieux-en-Cambrésis
Romeries
Saint-Aubert
Saint-Hilaire-lez-Cambrai
Saint-Martin-sur-Écaillon
Saint-Python
Saint-Vaast-en-Cambrésis
Saulzoir
Solesmes
Sommaing
Vendegies-sur-Écaillon
Vertain
Viesly
Villers-en-Cauchies

References

Cantons of Nord (French department)